Stefan Śliwa (13 August 1898 – 19 May 1964) was a Polish footballer. He played in three matches for the Poland national football team from 1922 to 1923.

References

External links
 

1898 births
1964 deaths
Polish footballers
Poland international footballers
Place of birth missing
Association footballers not categorized by position